The Voit Mexico City Open (also known as Corona Mexico City Open) was a tennis tournament held in Mexico City, Mexico from 2004 until 2007. The event was part of the ATP Challenger Tour and was played on outdoor clay courts.

Past finals

Singles

Doubles

References

ATP Challenger Tour
Tennis tournaments in Mexico
Clay court tennis tournaments